"A Woman's Way" is a song written by Fred Roberds and performed by Andy Williams.  The song reached #4 on the adult contemporary chart and #109 on the Billboard chart in 1969.

References

1969 singles
Andy Williams songs
Columbia Records singles
1969 songs
Song recordings produced by Dick Glasser